Rajendra Rajya Lakshmi Devi) was the consort of Pratap Singh Shah, King of Kingdom of Nepal. She was the regent of Nepal during the minority of her son Rana Bahadur Shah between 1777 and 1785.  During her eight years of regency, she contributed to the unification of modern Nepal begun by Prithvi Narayan Shah.

Life 
Rajendra Rajya Lakshmi Devi was born as a princess in Palpa.

Rajendra Rajya Laxmi was the daughter of Mukunda sen. She was the mother of Nagendra Shah (died aged six months) and Rana Bahadur Shah.  Her husband Pratap Singh Shah became king at the age of 23, and died when he was 26. Rajendra Rajya Lakshmi Devi then became queen regent for her son Rana Bahadur Shah.

Regency 
She became regent on 17 November 1777 A.D. In 1778 A.D, she was taken prisoner in silver handcuffs. 

She was restored on 20 June 1779 A.D and continued to be queen regent until her death. During the time, the principalities of Lamjung, Kaski and Tanahun were annexed to the kingdom of Nepal, under her military leadership.

Death 
Rajendra Lakshmi died on 1842 BS due to tuberculosis in Hanuman Dhoka Palace of Kathmandu.

Historic Evaluation 
Queen Regent Rajendra Rajya Lakshmi repelled the combined attacks of the Chaubise kings, and expanded Nepal's borders up to Kali Gandaki. She is viewed as an able administrator who extended King Prithvi Narayan Shah's unification  campaign. However, her reign was not free of problems, due to her strife with her brother-in-law Bahadur Shah, her court had become a space for courtly intrigues and conspiracies.

References 

Nepalese queens consort
1785 deaths
18th-century deaths from tuberculosis
18th-century women rulers
Tuberculosis deaths in Nepal
People of the Nepalese unification
People from Palpa District
18th-century Nepalese nobility
Nepalese Hindus
Queen mothers